You're My Home may refer to:
 "You're My Home" (song), a 1973 song by Billy Joel
 You're My Home (TV series), a 2015 Philippine TV series
 "You're My Home" (Grey's Anatomy), an episode of the American TV series Grey's Anatomy